The following is a list of the 660 names inscribed under the Arc de Triomphe, in Paris. Most of them represent generals who served during the French First Republic (1792–1804) and the First French Empire (1804–1815). Underlined names signify those killed in action. Additionally, the names of specific armies are listed, grouped together by the four compass facades of the arch: North (northern France, lower Rhine, Netherlands), East (Central Europe, Switzerland, Italy), South (Mediterranean Europe, Egypt, southern France) and West (Pyrenees, western France, notable units).

Related list: Battles inscribed on the Arc de Triomphe.

Northern pillar 

The 165 names inscribed on the Northern pillar (Avenue de la Grande Armée / Avenue de Wagram)

ARMEES DU NORD・DES ARDENNES・DE LA MOSELLE・DU RHIN・DE SAMBRE ET MEUSE・DE RHIN ET MOSELLE・DE HOLLANDE・DE HANOVRE

Eastern pillar 

The 164 names inscribed on the Eastern pillar (Avenue des Champs-Élysées / Avenue de Wagram)

ARMEES DU DANUBE・D'HELVETIE・DES GRISONS・DES ALPES・DU VAR・D'ITALIE・DE ROME・DE NAPLES

Southern pillar 

The 166 names inscribed on the Southern pillar (Avenue des Champs-Élysées / Avenue Kléber)

ARMEES DE DALMATIE・D'EGYPTE・D'ESPAGNE・DE PORTUGAL・D'ANDALOUSIE・D'ARRAGON・DE CATALOGNE・DU MIDI

Western pillar 

The 165 names inscribed on the Western pillar (Avenue de la Grande Armée / Avenue Kléber)

ARMEES DES PYRENEES ORALES・DES PYRENEES OCALES・DE L'OUEST・DE RESERVE・DU CAMP DE BOULOGNE・GRANDE ARMEE

See also 
 Battles inscribed on the Arc de Triomphe

References

Further reading 
  "Unfortunately, some names inscribed on the Arc de Triomphe are ambiguous due to notable individuals sharing the same last name. While most names are clearly honoring a particular officer, a few remain which are unclear."

Arc de Triomphe